Eighty Years of Book Cover Design is a 2009 book by Joseph Connolly published by Faber and Faber. It illustrates the distinctive cover designs used by Faber over the years.

External links
 Review in The Guardian
 "The art of book cover design" in The Independent
 Review in The Sunday Business Post
 Review in Soitu.es -- "Un magnífico libro"

2009 non-fiction books
Graphic design
Books about books
Faber and Faber books